Boca da noite is a 1974 album by Toquinho. Despite the partnership with Vinicius de Moraes at that period, this album presents a solo work of Toquinho, who elaborated all arrangements. However, it counts with an indirect contribution of artist, such as Vinicius de Moraes, Paulo Vanzolini and Geraldo Vandré, who composed some of the songs with Toquinho.

Track listing

Personnel

Toquinho – arrangements, vocals, acoustic guitar, viola, piano
Messias – viola
Isidoro Longano (Bolão) – flute
Jorge Henrique da Silva (Cebion) – tambourine
Nelson Fernandes Moraes (Branca de Neve) – surdo
Rubens de Souza Soares (Rubão) – ganzá
Antonio Pecci Filho (Cucho Xulim) – agogô

1974 albums
Toquinho albums